Dushyanta is a king of the Chandravamsha (Lunar) dynasty featured in Hindu literature. He is the husband of Shakuntala and the father of Bharata. He appears in the Mahabharata and in Kalidasa's play, Abhijnanashakuntalam ( 300 CE).

Legend
According to the Mahabharata, Dushyanta is the son of Ilin and Rathantī, also rendered Ilina and Rathantara, respectively. According to primogeniture, Dushyanta succeeds his father as the king of Hastinapura, because he is the eldest among his siblings Sura, Bhima, Pravashu, and Vasu.

Mahabharata 

The Mahabharata narrates that King Dushyanta was once hunting in the forests, when he struck a fawn with his arrow. The fawn fled to the ashrama of Sage Kanva, and the king followed it. Upon reaching the ashrama, the king saw Shakuntala watering the plants, accompanied by her friends, named Anasuya and Priyamvada. Dushyanta and Shakuntala fell in love with each other. Since the sage Kanva was absent from the ashrama, they married according to the gandharva rites, and Shakuntala soon became pregnant. The king presented her with his signet ring, and left for his palace. When Dushyanta left Shakuntala, she grew pensive, and did not realise the arrival of Durvasa to the ashrama. Reputed for his anger, Durvasa took her ignorance of him as a sign of disrespect, and cursed her to be forgotten by the man she was contemplating at that very moment. Shakuntala did not hear this curse being placed upon her. When Kanva returned and learnt of these events, he sent Shakuntala to the palace of Dushyanta. Owing to the curse, Dushyanta did not recognised her. Greatly aggrieved, while Shakuntala was returning to the ashrama, her mother, Menaka, took her to the ashrama of Kashyapa. Shakuntala delivered a son. The boy grew brave and fearless, and was able to subdue even the wildest of beasts in the region. Kashyapa, therefore, named him Sarvadamana (all-subduing). After a period of time, when Dushyanta was returning home after visiting Indra, he came across Shakuntala, recognised her, and took her and his son to his palace. This boy grew up to become Bharata. Bharata conquered the world, and acquired three wives, though the sons born of these wives were so cruel that they were slain. Bharata propitiated the devas for a son, and they gave him a boy, whom he named Vitatha, also called Bharadvaja. According to another account, Bharadvaja blessed Bharata with a son named Bhumanyu. Bharata ruled for twenty-seven thousand years, and therefore, the kingdom that he inherited and expanded came to be known as Bhārata, named after him.

Abhijnanashakuntalam 

During the summer, King Dushyanta pursued an antelope in the forest, when he was confronted by an ascetic. The ascetic told him that that the creature belonged to the ashrama of Kanva, and he was not to violate the sanctity of the land by slaying it. Dushyanta agreed to not kill the antelope, and was encouraged to visit the ashrama. He was told that he would be welcomed by Shakuntala, Kanva's adopted daughter, due to the sage's absence. Upon entering the ashrama, he came across three exquisite girls watering the plants, and became infatuated with Shakuntala, who was one among the trio. After a conversation with the bevy, he learnt that the true parents of Shakuntala were Vishvamitra and Menaka, which made Shakuntala a suitable bride for him due to her Kshatriya parentage. Dushyanta, however, chose not to reveal his identity. The company broke up due to hearing that an elephant was running amok, and Shakuntala grew enamoured of the visitor. The king directed his general to stop the chaos and instruct his men to stay away from the ashrama. He confessed his feelings to his companion and jester Vidushaka, urging him to think of a pretext to stay in the ashrama without arousing suspicion. Fortunately, a few ascetics approached him soon to request him to safeguard their yajna, which he readily accepted. He sent Vidushaka to his capital, and fearing that his friend would be a tattletale, he lied, stating that his feelings for Shakuntala were but a joke. For a time, he watched over the ascetics' yajna. Shankuntala soon confessed her feelings for Dushyanta, and the two were married according to gandharva rites. The king left for the capital, and promised his wife that he would send a suitable guard to escort her to his palace.        

In her solitude, Shakuntala was absorbed in thoughts of her husband, due to which she failed to offer the appropriate hospitality to the short-tempered sage, Durvasa. Durvasa cursed her, stating that the man she was thinking of to such an extent that he had been neglected would never remember her. One of Shakuntala's friends, Anasuya, offered an explanation of her friend's absent-mindedness, and sought forgiveness from the sage. Duravasa agreed to offer a concession of the curse, stating that the man would remember her upon the presentation of a token of recognition. Shakuntala's companions did not reveal this curse to her, reasoning that it did not matter; Shakuntala did, after all, have such a token of recognition, so her husband would no doubt recall her. Kanva returned to his ashrama, and offered his consent for the marriage. The curse took effect, and Dushyanta lost all memory of Shakuntala. When Shakuntala started to show signs of pregnancy, Kanva decided to send her to her lawful husband, explaining to her the duties of a wife and a daughter-in-law. Upon reaching the king's palace, Dushyanta failed to recognise Shakuntala, and merely expressed his incredulity when the accompanying sages urged him to accept her as his queen. Shakuntala searched for the ring that the king had presented her during their parting, but realised that it had been lost during the journey. While leaving the hall, the anguished Shakuntala is carried off by an apsara. After a while, the ring that Shakuntala had dropped in a pool of water was discovered by a fisherman inside a fish, which was produced before Dushyanta following accusations of theft. Durvasa's curse was broken upon the king seeing the ring, and his memory of his wife was restored. Helpless and repentant of his actions, Dushyanta dwelt on his childlessness, which caused him to faint. Matali, Indra's charioteer, arrived to Dushyanta's court, seeking his assistance in the war of the devas against the asuras. Dushyanta agreed to participate, viewing it as a welcome diversion. Dushyanta was successful in his war, and was honoured by Indra following their triumph. Matali escorted the king back to earth upon his vimana, and the two alighted upon the ashrama of Sage Kashyapa (Maricha in other accounts) to pay their respects. While the charioteer visited the sage, the king came across a boy who was the spitting image of himself, playing with a lion cub. He soon learnt that the boy, Bharata, belonged to the race of Puru, and was the son of Shakuntala. Shakuntala appeared, and the couple soon reconciled. Kashyapa explained the nature of the curse to Dushyanta, and assured him that the loss of his memory of his wife was not his fault. He pronounced his blessings on the couple. Together, the couple and their son returned to Hastinapura, and led a happy life.

References

External links
Abhijnana Shakuntalam of Kalidasa
Abhigyan Shakuntalam

Characters in Hindu mythology
 Mythological kings
 Characters in the Mahabharata
Lunar dynasty